Wind-up Entertainment was an American independent record label founded by Alan and Diana Meltzer in 1997. It was based in New York City and was distributed by BMG Distribution. Wind-up's best-selling artists worldwide were Creed and Evanescence.

History
Wind-up Records was formed in 1997 by Alan Meltzer, former owner of CD One Stop, and his wife Diana Meltzer, following their 1996 purchase of Grass Records. The parent company Wind-up Entertainment also runs numerous publishing companies as well as a full-scale retail, online and tour merchandising company.  The company's slogan was "Developing Career Artists".

Some of the successful acts on the label included Evanescence, Creed, Seether and Finger Eleven. The label has also re-released albums from bands previously associated with Grass Records, such as Toadies, the Wrens and Commander Venus.

The label's current roster includes Civil Twilight, Jillette Johnson, The Griswolds, The Virginmarys, Young Guns, Strange Talk, The Revivalists, Five for Fighting, Crobot, Filter, SPEAK, Genevieve and Aranda.

In September 2009, the label reached an agreement with EMI Music Germany and in February 2011 with EMI Music Canada. The partnership has seen EMI Music take over the marketing and distribution of artists such as Creed, Evanescence, Seether and Finger Eleven throughout the world outside of the US.

In Canada, distribution was initially with Sony Music Canada as was the distribution in the United States. However, in October 2004, distribution in Canada switched over to Warner Music Canada with the creation of Wind-up Entertainment Canada. Distribution in Canada moved again, for a third time in February 2011, this time to EMI Music Canada.

On October 31, 2011, the label's founder, Alan Meltzer, died at the age of 67.

In 2012, Universal Music Group acquired the EMI music operations, making the distribution in Canada solely distributed by Universal Music Group.

In October 2013, the Bicycle Music Company bought the rights to much of Wind-Up's back catalog, including the contracts to acts such as Seether. These artists will be distributed by Concord Music Group, which later merged with Bicycle. In May 2015, Concord bought the rest of the Wind-Up label.

In 2016, Concord retired Wind-Up as a frontline label, and transferred most of Wind-Up's artists to other labels. Wind-Up's reissues are released under Craft Recordings, Concord's reissue label.

Artist roster

Final roster

Accurate according to Wind-up's website as of October 9, 2016.

 Allday
 Aranda
 Civil Twilight
 Citizen Zero
 Crobot
 Eclypse Records
 Feenixpawl
 Filter
 Five for Fighting
 Genevieve
 Jillette Johnson
 The Revivalists - transferred to Razor & Tie
 SPEAK
 Spirit Animal
 Ryan Star
 Strange Talk
 The Griswolds
 Young Guns
 The Virginmarys

Previous artists
 12 Stones
 Alter Bridge
 American Pearl
 Atomship
 Baboon
 Bayside
 Ben Moody
 Big Dismal
 Bob Guiney
 Boy Hits Car
 Boysetsfire
 Brainiac
 Breaking Point
 Bridget
 Cartel
 Cauterize
 CFO$
 Company of Thieves
 The Crash Motive
 Creed
 The Darkness
 Ditch Witch
 The Drowners
 Drowning Pool
 Dust for Life
 Edgewater
 Emily Osment
 Evanescence
 The Exit
 Finger Eleven
 Godplow
 Hawthorne Heights
 It's Alive
 James Durbin
 Jeremy Fisher
 John's Black Dirt
 Julia Darling
 Loomis
 Megan McCauley
 Midnight Cinema
 Must
 New Radiant Storm King
 O.A.R.
 Papercut Massacre
 People in Planes
 Pilot Speed
 Pollen
 Push Play
 The Queen Killing Kings
 Scott Stapp
 Seether
 Seven Wiser
 Slowpoke
 Stars of Track and Field
 Stefy
 Stereo Fuse
 Strata
 Stretch Princess
 Submersed
 Tickle Me Pink
 Thriving Ivory
 Trickside
 The Wrens

Soundtracks
 1080° Avalanche (video game)
 Daredevil: The Album
 Elektra: The Album
 Fantastic 4: The Album
 John Tucker Must Die
 The Punisher: The Album
 Scream 3: The Album
 Walk the Line: Original Motion Picture Soundtrack

See also
 List of record labels

References

External links
 Official site
 Interview with Diana Meltzer, HitQuarters, July 2003

American record labels
Record labels established in 1997
Sony Music